The John Birch Society (JBS) is an American right-wing political advocacy group. Founded in 1958, it is anti-communist, supports social conservatism, and is associated with ultraconservative, radical right, far-right, or libertarian ideas.

The society's founder, businessman Robert W. Welch Jr. (1899–1985), developed an organizational infrastructure of nationwide chapters in December 1958. The society rose quickly in membership and influence, and was controversial for its promotion of conspiracy theories. In the 1960s the conservative William F. Buckley Jr. and National Review pushed for the JBS to be exiled to the fringes of the American right. More recently, Jeet Heer has argued in The New Republic that while the organization's influence peaked in the 1970s, "Bircherism" and its legacy of conspiracy theories have become the dominant strain in the conservative movement. Politico has asserted that the JBS began making a resurgence in the mid-2010s, while observers have stated that the JBS and its beliefs shaped the Republican Party, the Trump administration, and the broader conservative movement. Writing in The Huffington Post, Andrew Reinbach called the JBS "the intellectual seed bank of the right."

Originally based in Belmont, Massachusetts, the John Birch Society is now headquartered in Grand Chute, Wisconsin, with local chapters throughout the United States. It owns American Opinion Publishing, which publishes the magazine The New American.

Political positions
The John Birch Society from its start opposed collectivism as a "cancer" and, by extension, Communism and big government. The organization and its founder, Robert Welch, promoted Americanism as “the philosophical antithesis of Communism.” It contended that the United States is a republic, not a democracy, and argued that states' rights should supersede those of the federal government. Welch infused constitutionalist and classical liberal principles, in addition to his conspiracy theories, into the JBS's ideology and rhetoric. In 1983, Congressman Larry McDonald, then the society's newly appointed chairman, characterized the JBS as belonging to the Old Right rather than the New Right.

The society opposes "one world government", the United Nations, the North American Free Trade Agreement (NAFTA), the Central America Free Trade Agreement (CAFTA), the Free Trade Area of the Americas (FTAA), and other free trade agreements. It argues the U.S. Constitution has been devalued in favor of political and economic globalization. It has cited the existence of the former Security and Prosperity Partnership as evidence of a push towards a North American Union. The JBS has sought to reduce immigration.

The JBS supports auditing and eventually dismantling the Federal Reserve System. The JBS holds that the United States Constitution gives only Congress the ability to coin money, and does not permit it to delegate this power, or to transform the dollar into a fiat currency not backed by gold or silver.

The JBS opposed the civil rights movement of the 1960s and the women's Equal Rights Amendment in the 1970s. It has campaigned for state nullification. It opposes efforts to call an Article V convention to amend the U.S. Constitution, and it has been influential at promoting opposition to it among Republican legislators. 

Its publication The New American has described what it sees as American moral decline and threats to the family, including abortion, drugs, homosexuality, crime, violence, teenage pregnancy, teen suicide, feminism and pornography. The JBS has alleged that moral degeneracy is perpetrated by a conspiracy to make the United States vulnerable to internationalism.

The JBS has been described as ultraconservative, far-right, and extremist.  The Southern Poverty Law Center lists the society as a "Patriot" group, a group that "advocate[s] or adhere[s] to extreme antigovernment doctrines".  By the 1990s, the JBS was perceived as "more mainstream conservative" than in the 1960s. It has also been associated with the libertarian movement and business nationalism.

Influence on conservatism
The JBS contributed to the development of modern American conservatism through its organizational tactics and its promotion of right-wing political views. Despite never considering itself a religious organization, the JBS played a role in the rise of the Moral Majority and the Christian right as major political forces, ideologically and tactically influencing multiple leaders in that movement including Tim LaHaye and Phyllis Schlafly. The historian D. J. Mulloy wrote in 2014 that the JBS has served as "a kind of bridge" between the Old Right (including the McCarthyites) of the 1940s50s, the New Right of the 1970s80s, and the Tea Party right of the 21st century.

Professor Edward H. Miller wrote that Welch and the JBS were "never excommunicated" from conservatism and that "the ideas of the John Birch Society paved the way for the conservatism of the twentieth century" and "shaped events in the twenty-first century". Miller also credits JBS with helping stop the ERA and setting the stage for the Reagan Era, while Mulloy states that the JBS "played an essential role in the revitalization of conservatism."

JBS took an early stance in opposing abortion and social liberalism, and its TRIM committees, which supported lower taxes, helped lead to the Reagan tax cuts.  By the early 2020s, multiple commentators and academics argued that the John Birch Society and its beliefs had successfully taken over the Republican Party and the broader conservative movement.

History

Origins
The John Birch Society was established on December 9, 1958, in Indianapolis, Indiana, at the conclusion of a two-day session of a group of 12 people led by Robert W. Welch Jr.. Welch was a retired candy manufacturer from Belmont, Massachusetts, who had been a state Republican Party official and had unsuccessfully run in its 1950 lieutenant governor primary. In 1954, Welch authored the first book about John Birch titled The Life of John Birch. He organized an anti-Communist society to "promote less government, more responsibility, and a better world". He named his new organization in memory of Birch, saying that Birch was an unknown but dedicated anti-Communist, and the first American casualty of the Cold War. Welch alleged that a Communist conspiracy within the American government had suppressed the truth about Birch's killing.

John Birch was an American Baptist who went to China as a missionary in 1940, when the Japanese invasion had created suffering and chaos. He was a U.S. military intelligence officer under Brigadier General Claire Chennault in China. Chennault commanded the "Flying Tigers" and afterwards U.S. Army Air Forces units in China. In April 1942, Birch helped Lieutenant Colonel Doolittle and his flight crew (and other crews) a few days after they bailed out of their B-25 bomber over Japanese-held territory in China. Sixteen B-25's led by Doolittle bombed Tokyo ("Doolittle raid") off the Navy aircraft carrier USS Hornet during the United States' first attack on Japan. Beginning in July 1942, Birch, who spoke Chinese, became an Army intelligence officer. He operated alone or with Nationalist Chinese soldiers, and regularly risked his life in Japanese-held territory in China. His many activities included setting up Chinese agent and radio intelligence networks, and rescuing downed American pilots; he had two emergency aircraft runways built. Although he suffered from malaria, he refused furloughs.

In 1945, Birch was promoted to captain and began working in China both for and with the OSS, the U.S. wartime intelligence service in World War II. In August, after the Japanese surrendered, Birch was ordered by the OSS to northern China to get the surrender of the Japanese commanders at their installations. On August 24, nine days after the war, Birch left by train with his party which included two American soldiers, five Chinese officers, and two Koreans who spoke Japanese. After spending a night in a village, the party proceeded by handcar the next morning, and ran into a group of 300 armed Chinese Communists. Birch and his Chinese officer aide approached them and were told to surrender their weapons and the group's equipment. Birch refused, and after arguing about it with their commander, they were allowed to proceed. Along the way, Birch's party encountered more groups of Communists. The party arrived at a train station at Hwang Kao which was occupied by more Chinese Communists. Birch requested to speak with their leader. Birch and his aide approached the group's leader and after Birch refused to give up his sidearm, both were beaten and shot. Birch's corpse was bayonetted. The rest of Birch's party were taken prisoner. Birch's aide survived and the prisoners were later released. Birch's remains were recovered, and a Catholic burial service was held with military honors on a hillside outside of Suzhou, in eastern China. The Chinese Communists, who were active in northern China and Manchuria, were supposedly WWII allies with the United States. Birch believed that Mao Zedong and the Chinese Communists intended to take over China after the war and move into Korea. There were different explanations and theories as to why Birch was killed, ranging from his party showing up at Hwang Kao instead of Ninchuan, Birch's scheduled meeting with Chinese puppet troops of the Sixth Army under General Hu Peng-chu, misunderstanding by local guerillas, and provocation from Birch himself.

The founding members of the JBS included Harry Lynde Bradley, co-founder of the Allen Bradley Company and the Lynde and Harry Bradley Foundation, Fred C. Koch, founder of Koch Industries and Robert Waring Stoddard, President of Wyman-Gordon, a major industrial enterprise. Another was Revilo P. Oliver, a University of Illinois professor who was later expelled from the Society and helped found the National Alliance. Koch became one of the organization's primary financial supporters. According to investigative journalist Jane Mayer, Koch's sons, David and Charles Koch, were also members of the JBS. However, both left it before the 1970s.

A transcript of Welch's two-day presentation at the founding meeting was published as The Blue Book of the John Birch Society, and became a cornerstone of its beliefs, with each new prospective member receiving a copy. According to Welch, "both the U.S. and Soviet governments are controlled by the same furtive conspiratorial cabal of internationalists, greedy bankers, and corrupt politicians. If left unexposed, the traitors inside the U.S. government would betray the country's sovereignty to the United Nations for a collectivist New World Order, managed by a 'one-world socialist government. Welch saw collectivism as the main threat to western culture, and American liberals as "secret Communist traitors" who provided cover for the gradual process of collectivism, with the ultimate goal of replacing the nations of western civilization with a one-world socialist government. "There are many stages of welfarism, socialism, and collectivism in general," he wrote, "but Communism is the ultimate state of them all, and they all lead inevitably in that direction." Welch predicted that "you have only a few more years before the country in which you live will become four separate provinces in a world-wide Communist dominion ruled by police-state methods from the Kremlin".

The JBS was organized to be, in Welch's words, "under completely authoritative control at all levels". It incorporated aspects of business hierarchies and also the Communist cells Welch opposed but whose discipline he admired. Chapters of 10 to 20 members each had a leader appointed from above, and were expected to meet twice a month. Members of chapters that grew larger than 20 members were expected to break off and form a new small chapter.

The activities of the JBS include distributing literature, pamphlets, magazines, videos and other material; the society also sponsors a Speaker's Bureau, which invites "speakers who are keenly aware of the motivations that drive political policy". One of the first public activities of the society was a "Get US Out!" (of membership in the UN) campaign, which claimed in 1959 that the "Real nature of [the] UN is to build a One World Government". The society also alleged that Communists and UN supporters were conducting an "assault on Christmas" to "destroy all religious beliefs and customs". In 1960, Welch advised JBS members to: "Join your local P.T.A. at the beginning of the school year, get your conservative friends to do likewise, and go to work to take it over." One Man's Opinion, a magazine launched by Welch in 1956, was renamed American Opinion and became the society's official publication. The society publishes The New American, a biweekly magazine.

1960s
In the 1960s, the JBS was known as a right-wing organization with anti-Communist ideology. As of the middle of the decade, it had 400 American Opinion bookstores selling its literature.

By March 1961, the JBS had 60,000 to 100,000 members and, according to Welch, "a staff of 28 people in the Home Office; about 30 Coordinators (or Major Coordinators) in the field, who are fully paid as to salary and expenses; and about 100 Coordinators (or Section Leaders as they are called in some areas), who work on a volunteer basis as to all or part of their salary, or expenses, or both". According to Political Research Associates (a non-profit research group that investigates the far-right), the society "pioneered grassroots lobbying, combining educational meetings, petition drives and letter-writing campaigns. Rick Perlstein described its main activity in the 1960s as "monthly meetings to watch a film by Welch, followed by writing postcards or letters to government officials linking specific policies to the Communist menace". One early campaign against the second summit between the United States and the Soviet Union (which urged President Dwight D. Eisenhower, "If you go, don't come back!") generated over 600,000 postcards and letters, according to the society. In 1961 Welch offered $2,300 in prizes to college students for the best essays on "grounds of impeachment" of Chief Justice Warren, a prime target of ultra-conservatives. A June 1964 society campaign to oppose Xerox corporate sponsorship of TV programs favorable to the UN produced 51,279 letters from 12,785 individuals."

In 1962, William F. Buckley Jr., editor of the National Review, an influential conservative magazine, denounced Welch and the John Birch Society as "far removed from common sense" and urged the GOP to purge itself of Welch's influence.

In the late 1960s, Welch insisted that the Johnson administration's fight against Communism in Vietnam was part of a Communist plot aimed at taking over the United States. Welch demanded that the United States get out of Vietnam, thus aligning the Society with the left. The society opposed water fluoridation, which it called "mass medicine" and a Communist effort to destroy American children.
The JBS was moderately active in the 1960s with numerous chapters, but rarely engaged in coalition building with other conservatives. It was rejected by most conservatives because of Welch's conspiracy theories. The philosopher Ayn Rand said in a 1964 Playboy interview, "I consider the Birch Society futile, because they are not for capitalism but merely against Communism ... I gather they believe that the disastrous state of today's world is caused by a Communist conspiracy. This is childishly naïve and superficial. No country can be destroyed by a mere conspiracy, it can be destroyed only by ideas."

Former Eisenhower cabinet member Ezra Taft Benson—a leading Mormon—spoke in favor of the JBS, but in January 1963 The Church of Jesus Christ of Latter-day Saints issued a statement distancing itself from the Society. Antisemitic, racist, anti-Mormon, anti-Masonic groups criticized the organization's acceptance of Jews, non-whites, Masons, and Mormons as members. These opponents accused Welch of harboring feminist, ecumenical, and evolutionary ideas. Welch rejected these accusations by his detractors: "All we are interested in here is opposing the advance of the Communists, and eventually destroying the whole Communist conspiracy, so that Jews and Christians alike, and Mohammedans and Buddhists, can again have a decent world in which to live."

In a 1963 report, the California Senate Factfinding Subcommittee on Un-American Activities, following an investigation into the JBS, found no evidence it was "a secret, fascist, subversive, un-American, [or] anti-Semitic organization."

In 1964, Welch favored Barry Goldwater for the Republican presidential nomination, but the membership split, with two-thirds supporting Goldwater and one-third supporting Richard Nixon, who did not run. A number of Birch members and their allies were Goldwater supporters in 1964 and a hundred of them were delegates at the 1964 Republican National Convention.

The JBS opposed the 1960s civil rights movement and claimed the movement had Communists in important positions. In the latter half of 1965, the JBS produced a flyer titled "What's Wrong With Civil Rights?" and used the flyer as a newspaper advertisement. In the piece, one of the answers was: "For the civil rights movement in the United States, with all of its growing agitation and riots and bitterness, and insidious steps towards the appearance of a civil war, has not been infiltrated by the Communists, as you now frequently hear. It has been deliberately and almost wholly created by the Communists patiently building up to this present stage for more than forty years." The society believed that the ultimate aim of the civil rights movement was the creation of a "Soviet Negro Republic" in the southeastern United States and opposed the Civil Rights Act of 1964, claiming it violated the Tenth Amendment to the United States Constitution and overstepped individual states' rights to enact laws regarding civil rights. Some prominent black conservatives such as George Schuyler and Manning Johnson joined forces with the JBS during this period and echoed the Society's rhetoric about the civil-rights movement and the Civil Rights Act of 1964.

In April 1966, a New York Times article on New Jersey and the society voiced—in part—a concern for "the increasing tempo of radical right attacks on local government, libraries, school boards, parent-teacher associations, mental health programs, the Republican Party and, most recently, the ecumenical movement." It then characterized the society as "by far the most successful and 'respectable' radical right organization in the country. It operates alone or in support of other extremist organizations whose major preoccupation, like that of the Birchers, is the internal Communist conspiracy in the United States."

The JBS also opposed the creation of the first sex education curriculum in the United States through a division called the Movement to Restore Decency (MOTOREDE). Surviving MOTOREDE pamphlets date from 1967 to 1971. Additionally, the JBS advocated against other manifestations of social liberalism, including abortion.

John Birch Society members and activities were featured in "The Radical Americans", a series produced by National Educational Television (NET) and WGBH-TV that aired in 1966 on NET outlets.

JBS membership peaked in 1965 or 1966 at an estimated 100,000.

Eisenhower issue
Welch wrote in a widely circulated 1954 statement, The Politician, "Could Eisenhower really be simply a smart politician, entirely without principles and hungry for glory, who is only the tool of the Communists? The answer is yes." He went on. "With regard to ... Eisenhower, it is difficult to avoid raising the question of deliberate treason."

The controversial paragraph was removed before final publication of The Politician.

The sensationalism of Welch's charges against Eisenhower prompted several conservatives and Republicans, most prominently Goldwater and the intellectuals of William F. Buckley's circle, to renounce outright or quietly shun the group. Buckley, an early friend and admirer of Welch, regarded his accusations against Eisenhower as "paranoid and idiotic libels" and attempted unsuccessfully to purge Welch from the Birch Society. From then on, Buckley became the leading intellectual spokesman and organizer of the anti-Bircher conservatives. Buckley's biographer, John B. Judis, wrote that "Buckley was beginning to worry that with the John Birch Society growing so rapidly, the right-wing upsurge in the country would take an ugly, even Fascist turn rather than leading toward the kind of conservatism National Review had promoted." Despite Buckley's opposition, the author Edward H. Miller wrote, the JBS "remained a force in the conservative movement", and arguments to the contrary are "greatly exaggerated".

The booklet found support from Ezra Taft Benson, then Eisenhower's Secretary of Agriculture and later the 13th President of the LDS Church. In a letter to his friend FBI chief J. Edgar Hoover, Benson asked "how can a man [Eisenhower] who seems to be so strong for Christian principles and base American concepts be so effectively used as a tool to serve the Communist conspiracy?" Benson privately fought to prevent the Bureau from condemning the JBS, which prompted Hoover to distance himself from Benson. At one point in 1971, Hoover directed his staff to lie to Benson to avoid having to meet with him about the issue.

1970s
By 1976 the JBS had 90,000 members, 240 paid staffers and a $7 million dollar annual budget, according to a paper written by libertarian conservative tycoon Charles Koch.

The JBS was at the center of a free-speech law case in the 1970s, after American Opinion accused a Chicago lawyer, Elmer Gertz, who was representing the family of a young man killed by a police officer, of being part of a Communist conspiracy to merge all police agencies in the country into one large force. The resulting libel suit, Gertz v. Robert Welch, Inc., reached the United States Supreme Court, which held that a state may allow a private figure such as Gertz to recover actual damages from a media defendant without proving malice, but that a public figure does have to prove actual malice, according to the standard laid out in New York Times Co. v. Sullivan, in order to recover presumed damages or punitive damages. The court ordered a retrial in which Gertz prevailed.

Key causes of the JBS in the 1970s included opposition to both the Occupational Safety and Health Administration (OSHA) and to the establishment of diplomatic ties with the People's Republic of China. The JBS claimed in 1973 that the regime of Mao Zedong had murdered 64 million Chinese as of that year and that it was the primary supplier of illicit heroin into the United States. This led to bumper stickers showing a pair of scissors cutting a hypodermic needle in half accompanied by the slogan "Cut The Red China Connection". The society also was opposed to transferring control of the Panama Canal from American to Panamanian sovereignty.

The John Birch Society, along with other conservative groups such as the Eagle Forum and the Christian right, successfully opposed the Equal Rights Amendment in the 1970s. JBS played a key role in stopping the ERA's ratification – on par with Phyllis Schlafly, herself a JBS member – and it organized opposition to it across the nation. JBS accused the ERA's supporters of subversion, asserting that the ERA was part of a Communist plot "to reduce human beings to living at the same level as animals."

The JBS advocated for lower taxes, including reducing the federal income tax rate. By 1977, it had established over 200 TRIM (Tax Relief Immediately) committees across the U.S.

In the 1970s, the JBS played a prominent role in promoting the false claim that laetrile was a cancer cure, and in advocating for the legalization of the compound as a drug. A New York Times review in 1977 found identified JBS and other far-right groups were involved in pro-laetrile campaigns in at least nine states. "Virtually all" of the officers of the "Committee for Freedom of Choice in Cancer Therapy," the leading pro-laetrile group, were JBS members. Congressman and Birch Society leader Lawrence P. McDonald was involved in the campaign as a member of the committee.

The JBS also opposed Earth Day, suggesting that it was a Communist plot and noting that the first celebration fell on the 100th anniversary of Vladimir Lenin's birth.

The JBS was organized into local chapters during this period. Ernest Brosang, a New Jersey regional coordinator, claimed that it was virtually impossible for opponents of the society to penetrate its policy-making levels, thereby protecting it from "anti-American" takeover attempts. Its activities included the distribution of literature critical of civil rights legislation, warnings over the influence of the United Nations, and the release of petitions to impeach United States Supreme Court Justice Earl Warren. To spread their message, members held showings of documentary films and operated initiatives such as "Let Freedom Ring", a nationwide network of recorded telephone messages.

1980s and 1990s

After the Vietnam War, the JBS's membership and influence declined. This decline continued through the 1980s and 1990s due to Welch's death in 1985 (at age 85) and the end of the Cold War in 1991. By the mid-1990s, membership in the JBS was estimated between 15,000 and 20,000. While other anti-Communist organizations faded away following the Cold War's end, the JBS survived and experienced some growth in the 1990s. News reports said President George H.W. Bush's invocation of a "new world order" during the 1991 Gulf War gave the society a new audience.  The society consolidated its national office in Appleton, Wisconsin, the birthplace of Senator Joseph McCarthy.

In 1984, three members of the San Diego Padres, Eric Show, Mark Thurmond, and Dave Dravecky revealed they were members of the JBS.

The society campaigned against the ratification of the Genocide Convention, arguing it would erode U.S. national sovereignty.

The JBS continued to press for an end to United States membership in the United Nations. As evidence of its effectiveness, the society pointed to the Utah State Legislature's failed resolution calling for United States withdrawal, as well as the actions of several other states where the society's membership was active.

The second head of the JBS was Congressman Larry McDonald (D) from Georgia. McDonald's first wife "estimated that, over the years, he had hosted 10,000 people in his living room for Bircher-inspired lectures and documentaries." In 1982, McDonald was appointed as national chairman of the Society. McDonald was killed in 1983 when airliner KAL 007 was shot down by a Soviet interceptor.

William P. Hoar, a writer for the JBS who has attacked mainstream politicians from Franklin D. Roosevelt to George W. Bush, published regularly in The New American and its predecessor American Opinion. He coauthored The Clinton Clique with Larry Abraham alleging that Clinton was part of the Anglo-American conspiracy supposedly ruled through the Council on Foreign Relations and the Trilateral Commission. The Birch Society publications arm, Western Islands, published his Architects of Conspiracy: An Intriguing History (1984), and Huntington House Publishers published his Handouts and Pickpockets: Our Government Gone Berserk (1996).

In 1995, the JBS campaigned against plans for a Conference of States; proponents said such a conference would reduce federal powers, but the JBS feared it would lead to a second Constitutional Convention.

2000–present 
In the mid-2000s, the JBS, along with the Eagle Forum, mobilized conservative opposition to a so-called North American Union and the Security and Prosperity Partnership of North America.  As a result of two organizations' activities, 23 state legislatures saw bills introduced condemning an NAU while the Bush and Obama administrations were deterred "from any grand initiatives." In 2007, The New American published a special issue devoted to the topic; approximately 500,000 copies were distributed. The JBS also advocated for U.S. withdrawal from the UN.

The JBS was a co-sponsor of the 2010 Conservative Political Action Conference (CPAC), ending its decades-long distance from the mainstream conservative movement.

Although JBS membership numbers are kept private, it reported a resurgence of members in the 2010s and 2020s, specifically in Texas. A 2017 article in Politico describing the group's activities in Texas listed some of its stances as opposing the UN's Agenda 21 based on a conspiracy theory that it will "establish control over all human activity", opposing a bill that would allow people who entered the United States illegally to pay in-state college tuition, pulling the United States out of NAFTA, returning America to what the group calls its Christian foundations, and abolishing the federal departments of education and energy.

The JBS was associated with the Trump presidency by political commentators such as Jeet Heer (now of The Nation magazine), who argued while writing for The New Republic in June 2016 that "Trumpism" is essentially Bircherism. Trump confidant and longtime advisor Roger Stone said that Trump's father Fred Trump was a financier of the JBS and a personal friend of founder Robert Welch. Trump's former Chief of Staff Mick Mulvaney was the speaker at the John Birch Society's National Council dinner shortly before joining the Trump administration. Former Congressman Ron Paul (R-Texas), has had a long and close relationship with the JBS, celebrating its work in his 2008 keynote speech at its 50th anniversary event and saying that the JBS was leading the fight to restore freedom. The keynote speaker at the organization's 60th anniversary celebration was Congressman Thomas Massie (R-Kentucky.), who maintained a near-perfect score on the JBS's "Freedom Index" ranking of members of Congress. Right-wing conspiracy theorist Alex Jones, who hosted Trump on his Infowars radio show and claimed to have a personal relationship with the president, called Trump a "John Birch Society president" and previously said Trump was "more John Birch Society than the John Birch Society."

In July 2021, the Republican central committees of Kootenai County, Idaho, and Benewah County, Idaho, unanimously approved resolutions calling JBS "a valuable organization that is dedicated to restoring the Republic according to the vision of the Founding Fathers." The Idaho Republican Party declined to endorse the resolutions, though the chair of the Idaho Republican Party is a member. The JBS had been active in Idaho.

In 2022, the JBS campaigned against carbon-capture pipelines in Iowa, arguing they threatened property rights.

Officers

Chairmen and presidents
 Robert W. Welch Jr. (1958–1983)
 Larry McDonald (1983), a U.S. Representative who was killed in the KAL-007 shootdown incident
 Robert W. Welch Jr. (1983–1985)
 Charles R. Armour (1985–1991)
 John F. McManus (1991–2004)
 G. Vance Smith (2004–2005)
 John F. McManus (2005–2016)
 Ray Clark (2016–2019)
 Martin Ohlson (2019–present)

CEOs
 G. Allen Bubolz (1988–1991)
 G. Vance Smith (1991–2005)
 Arthur R. Thompson (2005–2020)
 Bill Hahn (2020–present)

In popular culture
 Pete Seeger lampooned the John Birch Society with a song called "The Jack Ash Society", recorded on his 1961 Folkways Records LP album Gazette Vol. 2. The name is a pun. On the surface, it's changing the name from one type of tree, birch to another, ash. However, the name "Jack Ash" also sounds like the word "jackass" which means "a foolish person".
 In 1962, Bob Dylan recorded "Talkin' John Birch Paranoid Blues", which poked fun at the society and its tendency to see Communist conspiracies in many situations. When he attempted to perform it on the Ed Sullivan Show in 1963, however, CBS's Standards and Practices department forbade it, fearing that lyrics equating the Society's views with those of Adolf Hitler might trigger a defamation lawsuit. Dylan was offered the opportunity to perform a different song, but he responded that if he could not sing the number of his choice he would rather not appear at all. The story generated widespread media attention in the days that followed; Sullivan denounced the network's decision in published interviews.
 Pogo cartoonist Walt Kelly lampooned the American anti-Communist movement, and the John Birch Society in particular, in a series of strips collected in 1962 in The Jack Acid Society Black Book.
 In 1962 The Chad Mitchell Trio recorded a satirical song "The John Birch Society" which made its way to no. 99 in the Billboard Hot 100.
 In the 1964 film Dr. Strangelove, a deranged U.S. Air Force general claims that water fluoridation would "sap and impurify all of our precious bodily fluids" and is part of a communist conspiracy, a parody of JBS claims.
 The 1973 song "Uneasy Rider" by Charlie Daniels contains a reference to "Brother John Birch" in the lyrics.
 In 2020, American journalist Robert Evans released a multi-part series on his podcast Behind the Bastards entitled "How The John Birch Society Invented the Modern Far Right".

See also

 Edmund Burke Society
 Granville Knight
 Rousas Rushdoony
 W. Cleon Skousen

References

General and cited references

Further reading

Scholarly studies
 
 McGirr, Lisa. Suburban Warriors: The Origins of the New American Right (2001), focus on Los Angeles suburbs in 1960s
 Schoenwald, Jonathan M.  A Time for Choosing: The Rise of Modern American Conservatism (2002) pp 62–99 excerpt and text search, a national history of the party
 Stone, Barbara S. "The John Birch Society: a Profile", Journal of Politics 1974 36(1): 184–197, in JSTOR
 Wander, Philip. "The John Birch and Martin Luther King, Symbols in the Radical Right", Western Speech (Western Journal of Communication), 1971 35(1): 4–14.
 Wilcox, Clyde. "Sources of Support for the Old Right: A Comparison of the John Birch Society and the Christian Anti-Communism Crusade". Social Science History 1988 12(4): 429–450, in JSTOR
 Wright, Stuart A. Patriots, politics, and the Oklahoma City Bombing. Cambridge University Press. June 11, 2007.

Primary sources
 Gary Allen. None Dare Call It Conspiracy. G S G & Associates, Inc., 1971.
  
 
 Robert W. Welch Jr. The New Americanism and Other Speeches. Boston: Western Islands, 1966.

Criticizing the John Birch Society
 Buckley, William F. Jr. (March 2008). "Goldwater, the John Birch Society, and Me". Commentary.
 
 De Koster, Lester (1967). The Citizen and the John Birch Society. A Reformed Journal monograph. Grand Rapids, MI: William B. Eerdmans.
 Epstein, Benjamin R., and Arnold Forster (1966). The Radical Right: Report on the John Birch Society and Its Allies. New York: Vintage Books.
 Grove, Gene (1961). Inside the John Birch Society. Greenwich, CT: Fawcett.
 Grupp, Fred W. Jr. (1969). "The Political Perspectives of Birch Society Members". In Robert A. Schoenberger, ed., The American Right Wing: Readings in Political Behavior. New York: Holt, Rinehart and Winston.  .
 Hardisty, Jean V. (1999). Mobilizing Resentment: Conservative Resurgence from the John Birch Society to the Promise Keepers. Boston: Beacon Press.

External links
 
 The New American, JBS biweekly publication which publishes the Freedom Index congressional scorecard twice a year
 John Birch Society at Political Research Associates
 Report of the California Senate Fact finding Subcommittee on Un-American Activities on the John Birch Society
 "What Is the John Birch Society?", short excerpt of a film, released c. 1965, of Robert W. Welch Jr., explaining why he founded the John Birch Society and its aims.
 Rating group positions by year at Project Vote Smart
 John Birch Society sound recordings collection at Stuart A. Rose Manuscript, Archives, & Rare Book Library

 
1958 establishments in Indiana
Anti-communist organizations
Appleton, Wisconsin
Conservative political advocacy groups in the United States
Critics of the United Nations
Organizations established in 1958
Paleoconservative organizations
Political organizations based in the United States
Politics and race in the United States
Right-wing populism in the United States
Conservatism in the United States